The Staircase is an American biographical drama streaming television miniseries created by Antonio Campos, based on the 2004 true crime docuseries of the same name created by Jean-Xavier de Lestrade. The series stars Colin Firth as Michael Peterson, a writer convicted of murdering his wife Kathleen Peterson (Toni Collette), who was found dead at the bottom of the staircase in their home. The series premiered on HBO Max on May 5, 2022.

Premise
Michael Peterson, a crime novelist, is accused of killing his wife Kathleen after she is found dead at the bottom of a staircase in their home. As the investigation continues, the family is thrown into a tumultuous legal battle. Meanwhile, a French documentary team takes an interest in the story.

Cast and characters

Main
 Colin Firth as Michael Peterson, a novelist and political hopeful living in Durham. His finances and personal life become the focus of the investigation and documentary.
 Toni Collette as Kathleen Peterson, his second wife and mother to Caitlin. She was a high-powered executive and well-liked by her family and community. 
 Michael Stuhlbarg as David Rudolf, Michael's lawyer
 Dane DeHaan as Clayton Peterson, Michael Peterson's oldest son from his first marriage who has his own legal issues from his past
 Olivia DeJonge as Caitlin Atwater, Kathleen's daughter from her first marriage. She initially supports her stepfather.
 Patrick Schwarzenegger as Todd Peterson, Michael's youngest son from his first marriage
 Sophie Turner as Margaret Ratliff, Michael's daughter, whom he adopted after her biological parents' deaths
 Odessa Young as Martha Ratliff, Michael's other adopted daughter
 Rosemarie DeWitt as Candace Hunt Zamperini, Kathleen's sister
 Tim Guinee as Bill Peterson, Michael's brother
 Parker Posey as Freda Black, a Durham county prosecutor
 Juliette Binoche as Sophie Brunet, the editor of the original documentary
 Vincent Vermignon as Jean-Xavier, the director of the original documentary

Recurring
 Joel McKinnon Miller as Larry Pollard, a lawyer who is neighbors and friends with the Petersons
 Maria Dizzia as Lori Campbell, Kathleen and Candace's sister
 Susan Pourfar as Dr Deborah Radisch 
 Justice Leak as Tom Maher
 Robert Crayton as Ron Guerette
 Cullen Moss as Jim Hardin, another Durham County prosecutor on whom Michael had previously written attack columns
 Cory Scott Allen as Art Holland 
 Morgan Henard as Dennis Rowe, a childhood neighbor and friend of Kathleen and Lori’s, eventual hookup of Michael’s
 Jason Davis as Fred Atwater, Kathleen's first husband and father to Caitlin
 Ryan Lewis as Bruce Campbell, Lori's husband
 Hannah Pniewski as Becky, Clayton's wife
 Kevin Sizemore as Mark Zamperini, Candace's husband
 Trini Alvarado as Patricia Sue Peterson, Michael's first wife and mother to Todd and Clayton
 Daniela Lee as Devon 
 Teri Wyble as Sonya Pfeiffer 
 Frank Feys as Denis Poncet
 Andre Martin as Yves, Jean-Xavier's boom operator
 Jean-Luc McMurtry as Gaultier, Sophie’s assistant editor
 Monika Gossmann as Agnes

Episodes

Production

Development
The series is a passion project for Antonio Campos, who began developing a scripted adaptation of the true crime docuseries The Staircase in 2008. On November 21, 2019, it was announced that Annapurna Television had officially put the project into development and was shopping the project to premium networks and streaming services. Campos was attached to write the series, as well as executive produce alongside Harrison Ford. On September 22, 2020, during an interview about his new film The Devil All the Time with Rian Johnson for Interview magazine, Campos revealed that HBO Max had landed the project for development. On March 31, 2021, it was announced that HBO Max had given the project a limited series order consisting of 8 episodes, with Campos set as showrunner and director of 6 of the episodes and American Crime Storys Maggie Cohn joining as writer, executive producer, and co-showrunner. In addition, Ford was no longer attached as executive producer. Upon the series order announcement, Campos said:

On July 19, 2021, it was announced that Leigh Janiak is set to direct two episodes of the series.

Casting
Harrison Ford was initially set to star in the lead role of Michael Peterson before being replaced by Colin Firth in March 2021. The following month, Toni Collette joined the cast in a lead role. Rosemarie DeWitt, Juliette Binoche, and Parker Posey were added to the main cast in May 2021, with Sophie Turner, Odessa Young, Patrick Schwarzenegger, Dane DeHaan, Olivia DeJonge, and Michael Stuhlbarg joining the next month. In July 2021, Tim Guinee and Vincent Vermignon joined the cast of the series. In August 2021, Justice Leak was cast in a recurring role.

Filming
Principal photography for the series began on June 7, 2021, in Atlanta, Georgia, and was scheduled to conclude in November 2021.

Release 
The miniseries premiered on May 5, 2022 with the first 3 episodes on HBO Max.

Home media 
The miniseries was released on December 27, 2022, on DVD. A Blu-ray and 4K Ultra HD Blu-ray are not yet announced.

Reception 
The series received positive reviews from critics, with praise towards Firth’s performance. The review aggregator website Rotten Tomatoes reported a 92% approval rating with an average rating of 7.80/10, based on 71 critic reviews. The website's critics consensus reads, "The Staircase doesn't hold many surprises for those already intimate with the original documentary, but this dramatization brings a fresh perspective and texture to the mystery—along with a terrific performance by Colin Firth." Meanwhile, Metacritic, which uses a weighted average, assigned a score of 80 out of 100 based on 29 critics, indicating "generally favourable reviews".

Members of the original documentary team criticised the series, with creator Jean-Xavier de Lestrade stating that he felt "very uncomfortable, because I feel that I’ve been betrayed." The original documentary team in particular criticised the series for misrepresenting the relationship between Sophie Brunet and Peterson, for suggesting that the team made editorial choices in order to portray Peterson in a more sympathetic way, and for falsely attributing work done by producer Allyson Luchak to Denis Poncet instead. David Rudolf also raised concerns about the series' factual accuracy, saying that there were "many things in the first five episodes, which I've seen that are inaccurate, misleading, and outright false." As well, Peterson criticised the series, saying that he hadn't been informed that the series was being made, and accused de Lestrade of selling out the story to HBO.

Awards and nominations

Notes

References

External links
 
 

2020s American crime drama television series
2020s American drama television miniseries
2020s American LGBT-related drama television series
2022 American television series debuts
2022 American television series endings
American biographical series
American television series based on French television series
English-language television shows
HBO Max original programming
Nonlinear narrative television series
Television series about families
Television series set in 2001
Television series set in 2002
Television series set in 2003
Television series set in 2004
Television series set in 2006
Television series set in 2007
Television series set in 2010
Television series set in 2011
Television series set in 2017
Television shows about murder
Television shows filmed in Atlanta
Television shows set in North Carolina
Television shows set in Paris